Harsinghpur is a village near Puranpur in Pilibhit district in the Indian state of Uttar Pradesh.  Harsinghpur is situated at (NH 730)four km from Puranpur on the way to Pilibhit.

Demographics 
 India census, total population of village is 133 and total house holds are 18.  Main occupation of people is farming and Dairying in Harsinghpur village.  All the families in this village are migrated from Punjab and settled permanently. Harsinghpur is very small village but famous in the area.

Religion 
Sikhism

Language Spoken 
 Punjabi
 English
 Hindi

Important Places 
 Gurudwara Singh Sabhaa (Established By Sant Baba Kesar Singh Ji) is main religious place in this village.

Families of Village 
 Cheema Family -( Migrated from Village Jhuggian Near Mehatpur, Nakodar, District- Jalandhar )Punjab And ancestral Village is Kotli Near Sahowala, District- Sialkot, Punjab (1947) (now in Pakistan) -Migrated around 1967-68 
 Chhina Family - Migrated from Amritsar District
 Sandhu  Family - Migrated from Mirakot Village, Amritsar

Other places 
 Cheema Farms
 Chhina Marriage palace
 Gurunanak Rice mill
  Agriclinic And Agribusiness Centre 
 PowerMax Gym and Fitness Point

Crops
 Wheat
 Paddy
Sugarcane
 Mustard

References 

Villages in Pilibhit district